BC Canis Minoris is a variable star in the equatorial constellation of Canis Minor. It has a reddish hue and is just barely visible to the naked eye with an apparent visual magnitude that fluctuates around 6.30. The distance to this object is approximately 520 light years based on parallax, but it is drifting closer with a radial velocity of −67 km/s.

This is an aging red giant star currently on the asymptotic giant branch with a stellar classification of M4/5III. It is a semi-regular variable of subtype SRb with measured pulsation periods of 27.7, 143.3 and 208.3 days, and an average visual magnitude of 6.30. With the supply of hydrogen at its core exhausted, it has cooled and expanded off the main sequence and now has around 60 times the girth of the Sun. On average, the star is radiating about 497 times the luminosity of the Sun from its swollen photosphere at an effective temperature of 3,507 K.

References

M-type giants
Semiregular variable stars

Canis Minor
Durchmusterung objects
059950
036675
Canis Minoris, S